Cavicchia is a surname. Notable people with the surname include:

Dominic A. Cavicchia (1901–1983), American politician, brother of Peter
Peter Angelo Cavicchia (1879–1967), American politician